Sir John McKenzie  (6 October 1839 – 6 August 1901) was a New Zealand politician. He served as Minister of Lands and Agriculture in the Liberal Government of John Ballance.

Early life
McKenzie was born in Ardross, Scotland, the son of a small tenant farmer, and while young saw the hardships caused by the Highland Clearances. When he was five-years-old in May 1845 the McKenzie was woken before dawn by his father and walked on a 16-mile journey to a small Presbyterian church at Croick. En route (despite his age) McKenzie witnessed the former inhabitants of the nearby Glencalvie estate huddled together in a graveyard after they had been evicted from their homes by an exploitative landlord. This is something he never forgot and the memory would shape the attitudes and actions of his life subsequently.

As a teenager McKenzie was farming with his father was farming at Baldoon where they also hired two further employees regularly. He commenced a typical rural apprenticeship, starting out as a shepherd before progressing incrementally to run a croft and eventually operating a leasehold farm of his own. Whilst still relatively young he fathered a daughter (Johan McKenzie, who was born on 23 June 1859) out of wedlock which made his social life awkward. He would later publicly accept sole custody for his daughter and gave her his surname to partially removed the stigma of her illegitimacy. Soon after he married Ann Munro, a widow six years his senior, 23 May 1860 at Dingwall shortly before they emigrated to New Zealand.

He arrived in Otago in September 1860, where he eventually began working for runholder Johnny Jones in Waikouaiti. His skill and experience with farming in the hilly country there, which was very reminiscent to those in Scotland, saw him promoted rapidly and by 1863 he was managing a giant run at Puketapu for Jones. After just two years he had saved enough money to achieve the independence he had always dreamed of. He purchased a 76-acre property of ordinary land just north of Palmerston valued at 10 shillings an acre which he named Ardross after his hometown.

Member of Parliament

He was elected to the Bushey Road Board as clerk and treasurer in 1865 and likewise served as secretary on the Palmerston school committee for that same year. McKenzie then ran for election to the Otago Provincial Council in 1868 for Waikouaiti, but was defeated. He was later elected for Waihemo in 1871. In-between his first election defeat and subsequent election, he assiduously practised delivering speeches in English (rather than Gaelic) and studied everything he could find concerning land laws. His scrupulousness paid off when he was able to defeat John Douglas, a rich and well-known landowner, who was much better educated than McKenzie and a far more proficient public speaker. Initially he was an ally of Donald Reid, but soon fell out with him after Reid's land policies proved to be insufficiently radical in McKenzie's eyes. He did develop a partnership with future Prime Minister Robert Stout during this period however.

McKenzie's early parliamentary career was undistinguished, though he did earn a reputation as an authoritative speaker on land issues. He supported his friend Stout in forming a government and was the government whip for the duration of the Stout–Vogel Ministry from 1884 to 1887. McKenzie quipped that his experiences as a hill-country shepherd provided him an ideal training ground for the job of a parliamentary whip.

He served as Minister of Lands from 1891 to 1900 in the Liberal Government. He was also Minister of Agriculture (1891–1900), Minister of Immigration (1891–1896) and Commissioner of Forests (1893–1900). He oversaw many land reforms, favouring small family farmers and the opening up of land for closer settlement. There were four things in particular he achieved during the government; he incorporated a graduated land tax into John Ballance's Land and Income Assessment Act 1891, including the lease-in-perpetuity tenure (or 999-year lease) as a major feature of the Land Act 1892, purchasing the Cheviot Hills estate in 1893 and introducing the state's right of compulsory purchase under the auspices of the Land for Settlements Act 1894.

On 17 May 1901, he was appointed a member of the New Zealand Legislative Council.

Later life and death
He was knighted as a Knight Commander of the Order of St Michael and St George (KCMG) in June 1901, on the occasion of the visit of TRH the Duke and Duchess of Cornwall and York (later King George V and Queen Mary) to New Zealand, and died of bladder cancer only six weeks later on 6 August 1901.

An elaborate funeral was given to McKenzie including pipers playing Flowers of the Forest with people openly weeping. McKenzie's biographer deemed the choice of music "...an appropriate choice of lament because lost battles of the past had prompted McKenzie to win a bigger victory in the Britain of the South [New Zealand]." He was buried in Palmerston cemetery.

Memorial

There is a memorial cairn to McKenzie on top of Puketapu, a prominent hill close to Palmerston in Otago. This cairn, erected in 1929 by Sir Joseph Ward, replaced an earlier cairn on another nearby hill in Pukehiwitahi, overlooking his first farm, which was erected in 1902, but quickly fell into disrepair.

A second memorial was erected in the North Canterbury town of Cheviot to recognise his role in breaking up William "Ready Money" Robinson's large Cheviot Hills estate into smaller farms and the town.

Notes

References

  Sir John McKenzie: Champion of the Small Farmer
 "McKenzie, Sir John." Encyclopædia Britannica

|-

|-

1839 births
1901 deaths
Deaths from bladder cancer
New Zealand Knights Commander of the Order of St Michael and St George
New Zealand Liberal Party MPs
Members of the Cabinet of New Zealand
People from Palmerston, New Zealand
Members of the Otago Provincial Council
Scottish emigrants to New Zealand
People from Ross and Cromarty
Deaths from cancer in New Zealand
New Zealand farmers
Independent MPs of New Zealand
New Zealand MPs for South Island electorates
New Zealand Liberal Party MLCs
Members of the New Zealand House of Representatives
Members of the New Zealand Legislative Council
19th-century New Zealand politicians
New Zealand politicians awarded knighthoods
People from Waikouaiti